The 1952 Connecticut Huskies football team represented the University of Connecticut in the 1952 college football season.  The Huskies were led by first year head coach Bob Ingalls, and completed the season with a record of 5–3.

Schedule

References

Connecticut
UConn Huskies football seasons
Yankee Conference football champion seasons
Connecticut Huskies football